Martin Kulldorff (born 1962) is a Swedish biostatistician. From 2003 to 2021, he was a professor of medicine at Harvard Medical School. He is a member of the US Food and Drug Administration's Drug Safety and Risk Management Advisory Committee and a former member of the Vaccine Safety Subgroup of the Advisory Committee on Immunization Practices at the US Centers for Disease Control and Prevention. 

In 2020, Kulldorff was a co-author of the Great Barrington Declaration, which advocated lifting COVID-19 restrictions on lower-risk groups to develop herd immunity through infection, while promoting the false promise that vulnerable people could be protected from the virus. The declaration was widely rejected, and was criticized as being unethical and infeasible by Tedros Adhanom Ghebreyesus, the director-general of the World Health Organization.

During the pandemic, Kulldorff opposed disease control measures such as vaccination of children, lockdowns, contact tracing, and mask mandates.

Early life and education 
Kulldorff was born in Lund, Sweden, in 1962, the son of Barbro and Gunnar Kulldorff. He grew up in Umeå and received a BSc in mathematical statistics from Umeå University in 1984. He moved to the United States for his postgraduate studies as a Fulbright fellow, obtaining a PhD in operations research from Cornell University in 1989. His PhD thesis, titled Optimal Control of Favorable Games with a Time Limit, was written under the direction of David Clay Heath.

Career 
Kulldorff was an associate professor at the Department of Community Medicine at the University of Connecticut (five years) and an associate professor at the Department of Statistics at Uppsala University (Sweden) (six years). He also worked as a scientist at the National Institutes of Health for four years. From 2003 to 2021, he was a professor of medicine at Harvard Medical School and from 2015 to 2021, he was also a biostatistician at the Brigham and Women's Hospital. 

Kulldorff developed SaTScan, a free software program used for geographical and hospital disease surveillance which is widely used, as well as a TreeScan software program for data mining. He is the co-developer of the R-Sequential software program for exact sequential analysis. He developed the statistical and epidemiological methods that are used in the software. These methods include spatial and space-time scan statistics, the tree-based scan statistics and various sequential analysis methods.

He helped develop and implement statistical methods used by the Vaccine Safety Datalink (VSD) project that the CDC uses, among other tools, to discover and evaluate vaccine health and safety risks.

In 2021, Kulldorff was named a senior scientific director at the Brownstone Institute, a right-wing think tank launched by Jeffrey Tucker that publishes articles challenging various measures against COVID-19, presenting research supporting authors' opinions, and discussing alternative measures. Jay Bhattacharya and Sunetra Gupta, his co-authors on the Great Barrington Declaration, also have had roles there. Tucker is the former editorial director of the American Institute for Economic Research (AIER), where the declaration was signed.

In December 2021, Kulldorff became one of the first three fellows, along with Bhattacharya and Scott Atlas, at the Academy for Science and Freedom, a program of the private, conservative Hillsdale College, a liberal arts school.

Views on COVID-19

In 2020, Kulldorff was invited to meet with leaders, lawyers and staff at the American Institute for Economic Research (AIER), an American libertarian think tank. Following the meeting Kulldorff took the lead in an effort to oppose lockdowns in favor of pursuing COVID-19 herd immunity before vaccines became available. His efforts resulted in the Great Barrington Declaration, an open letter co-authored with Oxford’s Sunetra Gupta and Stanford’s Jay Bhattacharya for the AIER. The document stated that lower-risk groups would develop herd immunity through infection while vulnerable groups should be protected from the virus. The World Health Organization, the National Institutes of Health and other public-health bodies said such a policy lacked a sound scientific basis. Scientists dismissed the policy as impossible in practice, unethical and pseudoscientific, warning that attempting to implement it could cause many unnecessary deaths with the potential of recurrent waves of disease spread as immunity decreases over time. Kulldorff and the other authors met with officials of the Trump administration to share their ideas on October 5, 2020, the day after the declaration was made public.

During the pandemic Kulldorff has opposed COVID-19 disease control measures. The measures opposed include lockdowns, contact tracing, vaccine mandates, and mask mandates. He has spoken out against vaccine passports, stating they disproportionately harm the working class.  Kulldorff and Bhattacharya opposed broad vaccine mandates, stating that the mortality risk is "a thousand fold higher" in older people than in younger people. He has argued against COVID vaccinations for children, saying that the risks outweigh the benefits.

In an Op-ed in the Wall Street Journal co-authored with Jay Bhattacharya, the authors stated that COVID-19 testing should not be used to "check asymptomatic children to see if it is safe for them to come to school" because of the difference in mortality risk for young persons compared to older persons. Instead, the authors wrote that "[w]ith the new CDC guidelines, strategic age-targeted viral testing will protect older people from deadly COVID-19 exposure and children and young adults from needless school closures".

On March 18, 2021, Kulldorff participated in an online roundtable with the governor of Florida, Ron DeSantis, to discuss COVID-19. In the video, which was posted on YouTube, DeSantis asked the group if children should wear masks in school and Kulldorff responded "children should not wear face masks. No. They don't need it for their own protection and they don't need it for protecting other people, either." In April, YouTube removed the recording of the roundtable, asserting it violated YouTube's policy regarding medical information. At the time the video was published, the Centers for Disease Control recommended universal indoor masking for children 2 years and older.

Kulldorff was a member of the Vaccine Safety Technical subgroup of CDC’s Advisory Committee on Immunization Practices. In April 2021, he disagreed with the CDC's pause of the Johnson & Johnson vaccine rollout and argued publicly that the vaccine's benefits outweighed clotting risks, particularly for older people.

In December 2021 Kulldorff published an error-laden essay for the Brownstone Institute in which he falsely claimed that influenza was more hazardous to children than COVID-19, and on that basis illogically argued against children receiving COVID-19 vaccination. In reality, influenza had been responsible for one child death in the 2020/21 season, while public health mitigation of COVID-19 was in placeCOVID-19 had, in contrast, killed more than 1,000.

On February 13, 2022, Kulldorff tweeted in support of the Canada convoy protest, which was organized to protest against vaccine mandates and other government restrictions regarding COVID-19. In December 2022, Florida Gov. DeSantis named Kulldorff, Bhattacharya, and several other opponents of the scientific consensus on COVID-19 vaccines to his newly formed Public Health Integrity Committee to "offer critical assessments" of recommendations from federal health agencies.

References

External links 
 
 

1962 births
People from Lund
Living people
Umeå University alumni
Cornell University alumni
Biostatisticians
Swedish epidemiologists
Harvard Medical School faculty
Swedish expatriates in the United States
Spatial statisticians
University of Connecticut faculty
Academic staff of Uppsala University